The 27th AVN Awards ceremony in Las Vegas, presented by Adult Video News (AVN), honored the best pornographic movies of 2009. The ceremony was held on January 9, 2010 in a new venue, the Pearl Concert Theater inside the Palms Casino Resort in Paradise, Nevada. During the ceremony, AVN Media Network presented awards in 125 of categories of movies or products released between October 1, 2008, and September 30, 2009. The ceremony was televised in the United States by Showtime. Comedian Dave Attell hosted the show with co-hosts Kirsten Price and Kayden Kross.

Among the new award categories introduced was Best Sex Parody due to the genre's quality and market impact. The category was one of three at the awards show where a tie was declared and in this instance The Sex Files: A Dark XXX Parody, an action-adventure send-up of The X-Files, and Not the Cosbys XXX, a spoof of The Cosby Show, were co-winners.

The 8th Day earned Best Video Feature honors and eight more awards and 21-year-old Tori Black won her first Female Performer of the Year award and won or shared five others, while Kagney Linn Karter won the Best New Starlet Award. Manuel Ferrara won his third Male Performer of the Year Award, joining Lexington Steele as the only actors to have done so.

Winners and nominees 

The nominees for the 27th AVN Awards were announced on December 2, 2009, in a press release. The winners were announced during the awards ceremony on January 9, 2010, which was broadcast on Showtime.

Major Awards 
Award winners are listed first and highlighted in boldface.

Additional Award Winners 
These awards were announced in a winners-only segment, but were not presented their awards on stage during the event and were not part of the televised awards show.

DVD Categories
 Best All-Girl Series: Women Seeking Women
 Best All-Sex Release: Evalutionary
 Best All-Sex Series: Addicted
 Best Alternative Release: Porn's Most Outrageous Outtakes 3
 Best Alternative Series: Naked College Coeds
 Best Amateur Release: 18 With Proof 2
 Best Amateur Series: Cherries
 Best Anal-Themed Release: Ass Worship 11
 Best Anal-Themed Series: Evil Anal
 Best Animated Release: PornoMation 3
 Best BDSM Release: Ivy Manor Slaves 3: The Dream Team
 Best Big Bust Release: Breast Worship 2
 Best Big Bust Series: Big Tits at School
 Best Big Butt Release: Big Wet Asses 15
 Best Big Butt Series: Big Wet Asses
 Best Classic Release: Debbie Does Dallas 30th Anniversary Edition
 Best DVD Extras: The 8th Day − Adam & Eve Pictures
 Best DVD Menus: 2040 − Wicked Pictures
 Best Educational Release: Tristan Taormino's Expert Guide to Threesomes
 Best Ethnic-Themed Release — Asian: Asian Fucking Nation 3
 Best Ethnic-Themed Release — Black: Phatty Girls 9
 Best Ethnic-Themed Release — Latin: Young Tight Latinas 17
 Best Ethnic-Themed Series — Asian: Cockasian
 Best Ethnic-Themed Series — Latin: Deep in Latin Cheeks
 Best Fem-Dom Strap-On Release: Forced Fem 3
 Best Foot/Leg Fetish Release: Party of Feet
 Best Foreign All-Sex Release: Bobbi Violates Europe − Evil Angel/Clark Euro Angel Video
 Best Foreign All-Sex Series: Rocco: Puppet Master − Evil Angel/Rocco Siffredi Productions
 Best Foreign Feature: Billionaire − Pure Play Media
 Best Gonzo Series: Jerkoff Material
 Best Interactive DVD: Interactive Sex With Tori Black
 Best Internal Release: All Internal  9
 Best Internal Series: Internal Damnation
 Best Interracial Release: Lex the Impaler 4
 Best Interracial Series: It's Big, It's Black, It's Jack
 Best MILF Release: It's a Mommy Thing! 4
 Best MILF Series: Seasoned Players
 Best New Line: Reality Junkies
 Best New Series: Glamour Girls
 Best New Video Production Company: Bluebird Films
 Best Online Marketing Campaign — Company Image: Sitcums.com – X-Play
 Best Online Marketing Campaign — Individual Project: The 8th Day, the8thdayxxx.com − Adam & Eve Pictures
 Best Oral-Themed Release: Feeding Frenzy 10
 Best Oral-Themed Series: Face Fucking Inc.
 Best Orgy/Gangbang Release: Young Harlots: Gangbang
 Best Orgy/Gangbang Series: Gangland
 Best Overall Marketing Campaign — Company Image: Vivid Entertainment and Digital Playground (tie)
 Best Overall Marketing Campaign — Individual Project: Throat: A Cautionary Tale, Vivid Entertainment Group
 Best Packaging: Operation: Tropical Stormy − Wicked Pictures
 Best Packaging Innovation: The 8th Day − Adam & Eve Pictures
 Best POV Release: Anal Prostitutes on Video 6
 Best POV Series: Jack's POV
 Best Pro-Am Release: Bang Bus 24
 Best Pro-Am Series: Brand New Faces
 Best Solo Release: All Alone 4
 Best Special Effects: The 8th Day
 Best Specialty Release — Other Genre: Asses of Face Destruction 5
 Best Specialty Series: Fishnets
 Best Squirting Release: Squirt Gangbang 4
 Best Squirting Series: Storm Squirters
 Best Transsexual Release: Rogue Adventures 33
 Best Transsexual Series: America's Next Top Tranny
 Best Vignette Release: Nurses
 Best Vignette Series: Penthouse Variations
 Best Young Girl Release: Young & Glamorous
 Best Young Girl Series: Barely Legal
 Clever Title of the Year: Who's Nailin' Paylin?

Performer/Creator Categories
 Best All-Girl Group Sex Scene: Eva Angelina, Teagan Presley, Sunny Leone, Alexis Texas − Deviance
 Best All-Girl Three-Way Sex Scene: Bree Olson, Tori Black, Poppy Morgan − The 8th Day
 Best Art Direction: 2040
 Best Director — Ethnic Video: Jules Jordan − Lex the Impaler 4
 Best Director — Foreign Feature: (tie) Moire Candy (Louis Moire/Max Candy) (Ritual) & Paul Chaplin (Black Beauty: Escape to Eden − Bluebird Films)
 Best Director — Foreign Non-Feature: Raul Cristian (Ass Traffic 6 − Evil Angel)
 Best Director — Non Feature: William H., Evalutionary
 Best Double Penetration Sex Scene: Bobbi Starr, Mr. Marcus, Sean Michaels − Bobbi Starr & Dana DeArmond's Insatiable Voyage
 Best Editing: Ren Savant, The 8th Day
 Best Makeup: Christi Belden, Lisa Berczel, Leonard Berczel, Nicki Hunter, Julia Ann, The 8th Day
 Best Male Newcomer: Dane Cross
 Best Music Soundtrack: Live in My Secrets
 Best Non-Sex Performance: Thomas Ward, Not the Cosbys XXX
 Best Original Song: “Bree's Bossa” by Joe Gallant − The Crack Pack
 Best POV Sex Scene: Kagney Linn Karter, Pound the Round POV
 Best Screenplay: Raven Touchstone − Throat: A Cautionary Tale
 Best Sex Scene in a Foreign-Shot Production: Aletta Ocean, Olivier Sanchez, George Uhl (Dollz House − Harmony Films)
 Best Solo Sex Scene: Teagan Presley, Not the Bradys XXX: Marcia, Marcia, Marcia!
 Best Supporting Actor: Tom Byron, Throat: A Cautionary Tale
 Best Supporting Actress: Penny Flame, Throat: A Cautionary Tale
 Best Tease Performance: Tori Black, Tori Black Is Pretty Filthy
 Best Three-Way Sex Scene: Tori Black, Rebeca Linares, Mark Ashley, Tori Black Is Pretty Filthy
 Best Videography/Cinematography: Monmarquis, David Lord, Ren Savant, The 8th Day
 Director of the Year (Body of Work): Will Ryder
 Female Foreign Performer of the Year: Aletta Ocean
 Male Foreign Performer of the Year: Toni Ribas
 MILF/Cougar Performer of the Year: Julia Ann
 Most Outrageous Sex Scene: Bobbi Starr in “Go Fuck Yourself” from Belladonna: No Warning 4
 Transsexual Performer of the Year: Kimber James
 Unsung Male Performer of the Year: Derrick Pierce
 Unsung Starlet of the Year: Shawna Lenee
Web and Technology Categories
 Best Adult Website: BangBros.com − Bang Productions
 Best New Web Starlet: Lexi Belle
 Best Retail Website: AdultDVDEmpire.com

Honorary AVN Awards

Hall of Fame 
AVN Hall of Fame inductees for 2010 were: Chris Charming, Stoney Curtis, Racquel Devine, Devon, Jessica Drake, Byron Long, Gina Lynn, Toni Ribas, Nicholas Steele, Michael Stefano, Valentino, Mark Wood
 Founders Branch: Christian Mann, Catalina Video; Michael Paulsen, Paradise Visuals; Michael Warner, Great Western Litho
 Internet Founders Branch: Ron Cadwell, CCBill; Tony Morgan, National Net; Morgan Sommer, Cybersocket

Multiple nominations and awards 

The following releases received multiple awards:
 9 awards: The 8th Day
 5 awards: Throat: A Cautionary Tale
 3 awards: Tori Black Is Pretty Filthy, 2040
 2 awards: Evalutionary, Lex the Impaler 4, Not the Cosbys XXX, The Sex Files: A Dark XXX Parody

The following releases received the most nominations:
 20 nominations: The 8th Day
 18 nominations: 2040
 16 nominations: The Sex Files: A Dark XXX Parody
 13 nominations: Throat: A Cautionary Tale, Pure
 11 nominations: Flight Attendants
 10 nominations: Seinfeld: A XXX Parody, Fuck The World

The following individuals received multiple awards:
 6 awards: Tori Black
 3 awards: Sasha Grey
 2 awards: Lexi Belle, Julia Ann, Kagney Linn Karter, Sunny Leone, Aletta Ocean, Teagan Presley, Ren Savant, Bobbi Starr

Presenters and performers 
The following individuals were presenters or performers during the awards ceremony.

Presenters

Trophy girls 

 Alexis Ford
 Janie Summers
 Sara Sloane

Performers

Changes to awards categories 
Beginning with the 27th AVN Awards, AVN Media Network added a category to the awards show titled Best Sex Parody. "Because of the amount of quality parodies that studios have produced in the past year and the impact they've had on the marketplace, we've decided to honor the best of those movies in their own category separate from our long-running Best Sex Comedy award", said Paul Fishbein, president of AVN.

See also 

 AVN Award for Male Performer of the Year
 AVN Female Performer of the Year Award
 AVN Award for Male Foreign Performer of the Year
 List of members of the AVN Hall of Fame

References

Other sources

External links 

 
 
 2010 AVN Award nominees

Articles containing video clips
AVN Awards
AVN Awards 27